List of mountains of Serbia and Montenegro may refer to:

List of mountains in Montenegro
List of mountains in Serbia
List of mountains in Kosovo